Mohammad Javad Manavinejad or Manavinezhad (born 27 November 1995 in Isfahan) is an Iranian volleyball player who plays as an outside spiker for the Iranian national team and French club Stade Poitevin Poitiers.

Manavinejad in 2015 year invited to Iran senior national team by Slobodan Kovac and made his debut match against United States in the 2015 World League.

Manavinejad with U21 Iran national team won gold the medal in Asian U20 Championship and selected Most Valuable Player.
He had a great performance in 2017 World League for Iran national volleyball team.
Manavinejad joined BluVolley Verona in 2017, with a two-year contract.

Honours

National team
World Grand Champions Cup
Bronze medal (1): 2017
Asian Games
Gold medal (1): 2018
Asian U23 Championship
Gold medal (1): 2015
Asian U20 Championship
Gold medal (1): 2014
Asian U18 Championship
Gold medal (1): 2012

Club
Iranian Super League
Champions (1): 2015 (Paykan)

Individual
Most Valuable Player: 2014 Asian U20 Championship

References

External links
Manavinejad on Instagram
Manavinejad on Facebook
 

1995 births
Living people
Iranian men's volleyball players
Sportspeople from Isfahan
Asian Games medalists in volleyball
Volleyball players at the 2018 Asian Games
Medalists at the 2018 Asian Games
Asian Games gold medalists for Iran
Iranian expatriate sportspeople in Italy
Iranian expatriate sportspeople in France
21st-century Iranian people